Ivan Slišković (born 23 October 1991) is a Croatian handball player who plays for TVB Stuttgart and the Croatian national team.

He participated at the 2019 World Men's Handball Championship.

References

External links

1991 births
Living people
Croatian male handball players
Sportspeople from Split, Croatia
Expatriate handball players
Croatian expatriate sportspeople in Egypt
Croatian expatriate sportspeople in Germany
Croatian expatriate sportspeople in Hungary
Croatian expatriate sportspeople in Slovenia
Veszprém KC players
Olympic handball players of Croatia
Handball players at the 2016 Summer Olympics
Handball-Bundesliga players
FC Porto handball players
Frisch Auf Göppingen players
Croatian expatriate sportspeople in Portugal
Competitors at the 2013 Mediterranean Games
Mediterranean Games silver medalists for Croatia
Mediterranean Games medalists in handball